Dai Chunrong (戴春荣) (born 1962 in Xi'an, Shaanxi) is a Chinese television actress and a former Qinqiang actress. Nicknamed the "empress specialist", she has portrayed over a dozen Chinese empresses in Chinese television series.

Filmography

Television

References

 《囧人的幸福生活》张霞扮演者戴春荣个人资料简介 . msvod.com

See also
 Sally Chen (born 1948), another actress specializing in Chinese empresses

Actresses from Shaanxi
Chinese television actresses
1961 births
Living people
Actresses from Xi'an
Participants in Chinese reality television series
Chinese opera actresses
Singers from Shaanxi
20th-century Chinese women singers
20th-century Chinese actresses
21st-century Chinese actresses
Qinqiang